Milford Clark Kintz was a member of the Wisconsin State Assembly.

Biography
Kintz was born on August 3, 1903 in the town of Richland, Richland County, Wisconsin. He was a farmer.

Political career
Kintz was a member of the Assembly from 1951 to 1964. Previously, he had served as Chairman of the Richland Town Board and on the Richland School Board and Richland County, Wisconsin Board of Supervisors. He was a Republican. He died on September 1, 1998 in Richland Center.

References

People from Richland County, Wisconsin
County supervisors in Wisconsin
Mayors of places in Wisconsin
School board members in Wisconsin
Republican Party members of the Wisconsin State Assembly
Farmers from Wisconsin
1903 births
1998 deaths
20th-century American businesspeople
20th-century American politicians